Arboga Municipality (Arboga kommun) is a municipality in Västmanland County in central Sweden. Its seat is located in the city of Arboga.

In 1971 the City of Arboga was amalgamated with a part of the rural municipality Medåker, forming a municipality of unitary type. In 1974 the parish Götlanda was added from the dissolved Glanshammar municipality and transferred from Örebro County.

Localities 
 Arboga (seat)
 Götlunda
 Kvarnsjön
 Medåker
 Medinge
 Värhulta

Riksdag elections

References

External links

Arboga Municipality – Official site
Arboga -Bilingual site

Municipalities of Västmanland County
Arboga